Đelekovec is a municipality and a village in northern Croatia, located north of Koprivnica, near the river Drava. The population of village Đelekovec is 1,192, and the municipality also includes the nearby village of Imbriovec with 341 residents.

History
In the late 19th century and early 20th century, Ðelekovec was part of Varaždin County of the Kingdom of Croatia-Slavonia.

References

Populated places in Koprivnica-Križevci County
Municipalities of Croatia